This is a list of U.S. state, federal district, and territory trees, including official trees of the following of the states, of the federal district, and of the territories.

See also
 List of U.S. state, district, and territorial insignia
 National Grove of State Trees
 National Register of Champion Trees

Notes

References

State

U.S. state trees
Trees
.